Klas Bernhard Johannes Karlgren (15 October 1889 – 20 October 1978) was a Swedish sinologist and linguist who pioneered the study of Chinese historical phonology using modern comparative methods. In the early 20th century, Karlgren conducted large surveys  of the varieties of Chinese and studied historical information on rhyming in ancient Chinese poetry, then used them to create the first ever complete reconstructions of what are now called Middle Chinese and Old Chinese.

Early life and education
Bernhard Karlgren was born on 15 October 1889 in Jönköping, Sweden. His father, Johannes Karlgren, taught Latin, Greek, and Swedish at the local high school.  Karlgren showed ability in linguistics from a young age, and was interested in Sweden's dialects and traditional folk stories. He mastered classical languages and was an accomplished translator of Greek poetry into his native language. He displayed an early interest in China, and wrote a drama, The White Hind, set in that country in his early teens. His first scholarly article, a phonetic transcription, based on a system devised by Johan August Lundell, of traditional folk stories from his native province of Småland, was completed when he was 14, and published in 1908 when he was only 18 years old. He studied Russian at Uppsala University under Johan August Lundell, a Slavicist interested in comparative linguistics. He graduated in 1909 with a bachelor's degree in Nordic, Greek, and Slavonic languages.  Although he initially intended to specialize in the Scandinavian languages, on the advice of his elder brother Anton Karlgren (18821973) he decided to focus on Chinese instead, attracted to it also by the fact that, as Lundell had told him, Chinese contained a great number of dialects. He departed for St. Petersburg, which, under the guidance of Vasily Vasilyev, had created one of the major European centres for the study of Chinese.  While there, Karlgren, studying under A. I. Ivanov, won a grant to study Chinese dialects, even though he had no background in Chinese at that point.

Karlgren lived in China from 1910 to 1912. He achieved basic fluency and literacy after only a few months of study, and prepared a questionnaire of 3,100 Chinese characters to gather information on Chinese dialects. After his grant money ran out, Karlgren supported himself by teaching French and, famously, English, which, according to one anecdote, he had never been taught but had picked up from English-speaking passengers on the ship from Europe to China. In fact he had received a high credit in English in his final High School exams.  He eventually gathered data on 19 different Mandarin dialects, as well as Shanghainese, the Fuzhou dialect of Eastern Min, and Cantonese, plus the Vietnamese and Japanese pronunciations of the characters in his questionnaire.

Career

Karlgren returned to Europe in January 1912, first staying in London, then in Paris, before arriving in Uppsala, where in 1915 he produced his doctoral dissertation, "" ("Studies on Chinese Phonology"). Although his dissertation was written in French, most of his subsequent scholarly works were in English. After obtaining his doctorate, Karlgren taught at the University of Gothenburg, serving as its rector from 1931 to 1936.

In 1939, Karlgren succeeded Johan Gunnar Andersson as director of the Museum of Far Eastern Antiquities, a post he held until 1959. This public museum was founded in 1926 on Andersson's pioneering discoveries of prehistoric archaeology made in China in the 1920s, and later expanded to cover later periods as well as other parts of Asia. Karlgren had been in close contact with Andersson for many years, and also succeeded Andersson as editor of the museum's journal, the Bulletin of the Museum of Far Eastern Antiquities (BMFEA, 1929–) and continued in this position until the 1970s. Karlgren himself first published many of his own major works in this annual journal, or as books in the monograph series of the museum.

In 1946, Karlgren began a far-reaching attack on the then rather loosely argued historiography of ancient China. Reviewing the literature on China's pre-Han history in his article Legends and Cults in Ancient China, he pointed out that "a common feature to most of these treatises is a curious lack of critical method in the handling of the material". In particular, Karlgren criticised the unselective use of documents from different ages when reconstructing China's ancient history. "In this way very full and detailed accounts have been arrived at—but accounts that are indeed caricatures of scientifically established ones."

In 1950, Karlgren was inducted into the Royal Netherlands Academy of Arts and Sciences.

Death and legacy 

Karlgren died on 20 October 1978 in Stockholm at age 89.

Karlgren was the first scholar to use European-style principles of historical linguistics to study the Chinese language. He was also the first one to reconstruct the sounds of what are now called Middle Chinese and Old Chinese (what he called "Ancient Chinese" and "Archaic Chinese" respectively). Karlgren suggested that at the very earliest stage recoverable, the personal pronouns were declined for case.

Karlgren attempted to unearth Chinese history itself from its linguistic development and diffusion. As he writes in his English adaptation Sound and Symbol in Chinese (1923), Chapter I: "Thus, though Chinese traditions give no hint whatever of an immigration from any foreign country, and though there consequently is no external chronological point d'appui, we are nonetheless able to state, from internal evidence, that the Chinese tradition which places the reign of the emperor Yao in the twenty-fourth century B.C. is correct; that the Chinese even in those remote times were skilled astronomers; that they put down in writing in the Chinese language records of memorable events, and in all probability wrote their accounts soon after the events; in short, that a well-developed Chinese civilization—resting undoubtedly on foundations many centuries old—together with the Chinese language, existed on Chinese soil two thousand years before Christ."

Although important as a pioneer of historical Chinese linguistics, Karlgren's original findings have been surpassed. Today the phonological systems proposed by Karlgren have largely been superseded, as their weaknesses are obvious: "Karlgren saw himself as reconstructing phonetics, not phonology, and paid little attention to phonological structure. As a result, the systems he reconstructed often lack the symmetry and pattern which are in the phonological systems of natural languages." Nevertheless, Karlgren's groundbreaking works laid the foundation of modern Chinese historical linguistics and many of his works are still used as works of reference.

Awards and decorations
   Commander Grand Cross of the Order of the Polar Star (23 November 1961)

Selected works
 
  Adapted as Sound and symbol in Chinese, London: Oxford University Press, 1923. Reprinted 2007: Toronto: Global Language Press, .
 
  Reprinted by Dover Publications, .
 
 
 
 
 
 
 
 
 
 
 
 
 
 

In Swedish he published numerous popular works on Chinese language, culture and history. In the 1940s, he published three novels under the pen name Klas Gullman.

See also 

 Grammata Serica Recensa
 Karlgren–Li reconstruction of Middle Chinese

Notes 
Footnotes

Works cited
 
 
 
  Translation of Göran Malmqvist,  [Bernhard Karlgren: Portrait of a Scholar], Stockholm: Norstedts. 1995.
 

1889 births
1978 deaths
People from Jönköping
Swedish sinologists
Linguists from Sweden
Historical linguists
Uppsala University alumni
Academic staff of the University of Gothenburg
Rectors of the University of Gothenburg
Recipients of the Pour le Mérite (civil class)
Members of the Royal Netherlands Academy of Arts and Sciences
Paleolinguists
20th-century linguists
Corresponding Fellows of the British Academy
Commanders Grand Cross of the Order of the Polar Star
Members of the Royal Gustavus Adolphus Academy